Balkan Brass Battle is Fanfare Ciocărlia's sixth studio album. It is a collaboration with the Serbian brass band, Boban & Marko Marković Orchestra. Balkan Brass Battle was recorded in Pensiune Dracula (a hotel complex) in northern Romania in March 2011.

Track listing 
 Battle Call - 00:36 
 Mrak Kolo (Boban & Marko Marković Orchestra) - 04:21 
 Suita a la Ciobanas (Fanfare Ciocărlia) - 04:13 
 James Bond Theme (Boban & Marko Marković Orchestra vs. Fanfare Ciocărlia) - 04:11 
 Caravan (Fanfare Ciocărlia) - 03:34 
 Caravan (Boban & Marko Marković Orchestra) - 03:18 
 Devla (Boban & Marko Marković Orchestra vs. Fanfare Ciocărlia) - 04:07 
 Topdzijsko Kolo (Boban & Marko Marković Orchestra) - 03:05
 Dances from the monastery hills (Fanfare Ciocărlia) - 02:57 
 Disco Dzumbus (Boban & Marko Marković Orchestra vs. Fanfare Ciocărlia) - 03:26 
 I am your Gummy Bear (Fanfare Ciocărlia) - 03:12 
 Otpisani (Boban & Marko Marković Orchestra) - 04:00 
 Asfalt Tango (Boban & Marko Marković Orchestra vs. Fanfare Ciocărlia) - 05:14

References
 

 Bob Baker Fish (6 September 2011) "Balkan Brass Battle review"
 Overview international Balkan Brass Battle reviews 

2011 albums
Fanfare Ciocărlia albums